Frost & Adams (est.1869) was an artists' supply firm in Boston, Massachusetts, located in Cornhill, on the current site of Boston City Hall and City Hall Plaza. It began in 1869 when artist Francis Seth Frost and retailer E.H. Adams bought the business of Matthew J. Whipple. By the 1880s Frost & Adams were "the chief dealers in artists' materials in New England."

History
Proprietors included F.S. Frost, E.H. Adams, H.A. Lawrence, Herbert C. Gardner, Joseph H. Peacock, and Edward J. White. The firm later moved to Arch Street (ca.1921).

In the 1880s the firm stocked "all the materials used by painters, engravers, etchers, repousse-workers, china-painters, crayon artists, water colorists, tapestry-painters, architects, engineers, and draughtsmen." They also carried "fancy articles for decorating, in bronze and brass, porcelain and china, Albenine and Barbotine ware, bisque vases and terraline ware, tambourines of sheepskin, calfskin, brass, and satin." "Five-sixths of the trade is wholesale, extending throughout New England, the Middle and Western States, and Canada, and kept in activity by travelling salesmen."

Some art world luminaries shopped at Frost & Adams. It was "the depot of supplies for Hunt, Inness, Neal, Brown, Enneking, Norton, Vinton, Picknell, Gaugengigl, Shapleigh, ... H.H. Richardson, Cabot & Chandler, Van Brunt & Howe, Peabody & Stearns."

Sometime after 1921, Frost & Adams was bought by the H.H. Sullivan Company, which itself was acquired by B.L. Makepeace Inc. in 1931. As of 2010, Makepeace operates from headquarters in Brighton, Massachusetts, and specializes in reprographics and survey equipment.

In 2019, the Frost & Adams brand was revived and refreshed by The Juna Group, LLC.

References

Further reading
 Frost & Adams Co, Boston. Descriptive Catalogue. Importers of Artists' Materials, Draughting Papers, Tracing Cloth, and Mathematical Instruments, 1877.
 Norman E. Muller. Checklist of Boston Retailers in Artist's Materials: 1823-1887. Journal of the American Institute for Conservation, Vol. 17, No. 1 (Autumn, 1977), pp. 53–69

External links
 Catalogue of Artists' Materials & Mathematical Instruments, Frost & Adams Co., Boston, Massachusetts, USA, 1905
 Flickr. Photo of canvas from Frost and Adams Cornhill-Boston ca.1856
 Flickr. Close-up photo of canvas from Frost and Adams Cornhill-Boston ca.1856

Images

1869 establishments in Massachusetts
19th century in Boston
Cultural history of Boston
Government Center, Boston
Economic history of Boston
Financial District, Boston
Visual arts materials